Barry may refer to:

People and fictional characters
 Barry (name), including lists of people with the given name, nickname or surname, as well as fictional characters with the given name
 Dancing Barry, stage name of Barry Richards (born c. 1950), former dancer at National Basketball Association games
 David Francis Barry (1854 – 1934), photographer of the American West

Places

Canada
Barry Lake, Quebec
Barry Islands, Nunavut

United Kingdom
 Barry, Angus, Scotland, a village
 Barry Mill, a watermill
 Barry, Vale of Glamorgan, Wales, a town
 Barry Island, a seaside resort
 Barry Railway Company
 Barry railway station

United States
 Barry, Illinois, a city
 Barry, Minnesota, a city
 Barry, Texas, a city
 Barry County, Michigan
 Barry County, Missouri
 Barry Township (disambiguation), in several states
 Fort Barry, Marin County, California, a former US Army installation

Elsewhere
 Barry Island (Debenham Islands), Antarctica
 Barry, New South Wales, Australia, a village
 Barry, Hautes-Pyrénées, France, a commune

Arts and entertainment
 Barry (album), by Barry Manilow
 "Barry", a character from the Marillion album cover Anoraknophobia
 Barry (1949 film), a French film
 Barry (2016 film), an American film
 Barry (TV series), an American dark comedy series
 Barry Award (for crime novels)
 Melbourne International Comedy Festival Award, formerly called the Barry Award

Other uses
 Barry (heraldry)
 Barry (dog) (1800–1814), a mountain rescue St. Bernard
 Barry (radio), an Australian radio station
 Barry (UK Parliament constituency)
 Barry University, a private Catholic university in Miami Shores, Florida
 Tropical Storm Barry
 , four US destroyers
 1703 Barry, a minor planet
 Barry (owl), New York City owl

See also
 De Barry family
 Dubarry (disambiguation)
 Barre (disambiguation)
 Barrie (disambiguation)
 Barry's (disambiguation) 
 Berry (disambiguation)